Supersystem, released in 1998, is the debut album by the Feelers. Since its release it has sold over four times platinum in the NZ Music Charts and is the winner of five NZ music awards in 1998. Singles include "Pressure Man", "Venus", "Friend" and "Supersystem".

Track listing

Chart performance and certifications
In September 1998, Supersystem peaked at #1 in New Zealand. While the album was on the New Zealand albums chart, Supersystem was certified four times platinum in June 1999.

References

1998 albums
The Feelers albums